is a series of Japanese anime films produced by Aniplex and Shaft based on the 2011 anime television series of the same name. The first two films, Beginnings and Eternal, were released in October 2012 and serve as a recap of the television series with redone voice acting and newly animated footage. The third film, Rebellion, is an all-new original work, and was released by Warner Bros. Pictures in October 2013.

A manga adaptation illustrated by Hanokage was released by Houbunsha between November 2013 and January 2014. The films are distributed in North America by Aniplex of America.

The third film, Rebellion, was nominated for the Japan Academy Prize for Animation of the Year and won the Best Theatrical Film Award at the 19th Animation Kobe Awards. In April 2021, it was announced that a sequel movie to Rebellion was in production, titled Walpurgisnacht: Rising.

Plot

In Puella Magi Madoka Magica, there are certain creatures that can grant a chosen girl any wish they may desire. In exchange for that wish, however, that girl must become a magical girl who must fight against witches, creatures born from despair that are responsible for accidents, disease, and suicide. In the city of Mitakihara, a girl named Madoka Kaname is approached by a cat-like creature named Kyubey with the offer of becoming a magical girl. Meanwhile, another magical girl named Homura Akemi seeks to do everything in her power to stop Madoka from becoming one. Madoka soon learns that the life of a magical girl is not the dreamlike fantasy she imagined and is instead filled with sadness and despair.

Beginnings
In Mitakihara city, a girl named Madoka Kaname meets a new transfer student, Homura Akemi, who coldly warns her to remain as she is lest she risk losing everything. Later that day, Madoka and her friend Sayaka Miki are shopping when they find themselves protecting a strange cat-like creature named Kyubey from Homura. They are caught in a mystical barrier and approached by strange monsters, but are rescued by Mami Tomoe. Madoka and Sayaka learn Mami is a magical girl who fights demonic beings called witches, who spread curses and despair on human beings. Kyubey offers the two girls the opportunity to also become magical girls: in return for forging a contract and having a wish granted, they gain a Soul Gem—the source of their magic—and are tasked with hunting down witches. Killing a witch leaves behind Grief Seeds, which they may use to replenish and purify their Soul Gems. Homura, a magical girl herself with the ability to seemingly appear out of nowhere, is strongly against Madoka making a contract, but Madoka, wanting to help others, almost does so after being inspired by Mami. However, Madoka reconsiders after witnessing Mami's brutal death while fighting a witch named Charlotte. Sayaka becomes a magical girl to heal the debilitating injury afflicting her childhood friend, Kyosuke Kamijo. Sayaka soon comes into conflict with another magical girl named Kyoko Sakura, whom Homura recruits to deal with a powerful witch named Walpurgisnacht, who will appear and devastate Mitakihara in two weeks.

When Madoka learns that Sayaka and Kyoko are fighting on a highway bridge, she intervenes by throwing Sayaka's Soul Gem onto a passing truck, which carries it away and causes Sayaka to immediately fall dead. This reveals the horrifying truth: the Soul Gems used by magical girls are their actual souls, extracted from their bodies by Kyubey after forging the contract. Kyubey describes the process as turning their bodies into mere "hardware" controlled by their Soul Gems, which are usually kept close to them at all times, and allows their bodies to better endure the hardship of battle. The destruction of the Soul Gem also means permanent death for a magical girl, and they must locate Grief Seeds from defeated witches or risk running out of magic and being unable to maintain their bodies. When her Soul Gem is recovered, Sayaka revives and is horrified. Kyubey expresses flat confusion at their reactions, reasoning that the contract is fair and the process is logically sound. Kyoko later tries to help Sayaka cope by telling her of her own experience, in which her wish inadvertently destroyed her family. However, Sayaka falls deeper into despair after learning that her classmate and friend, Hitomi Shizuki, plans to confess her own love to Kyosuke. After Kyubey tells her that she has more magical potential than any girl it has ever seen, Madoka nearly forges a contract to restore Sayaka to normal, but is stopped seconds before when Homura manages to kill Kyubey. The close call causes Homura to break down, tearfully begging Madoka not to be so foolishly selfless, before Madoka runs off to find Sayaka. As Madoka leaves, another Kyubey appears and Homura calls it by its true name: Incubator. Elsewhere, Kyoko finds Sayaka, now fully sunken in despair. Sayaka's Soul Gem completely darkens and explodes into a Grief Seed. As darkness flows out of the Grief Seed, Kyubey muses how a "magical girl" is what they call the juvenile form of a "witch".

Eternal
Homura saves Kyoko and Sayaka's lifeless body from the newly emerged witch Oktavia von Seckendorff, revealing that the witch is Sayaka herself: magical girls whose Soul Gems become fully tainted and succumb to despair become converted into witches, and their Soul Gems becoming Grief Seeds. Kyubey explains that he is part of an emotionless alien species called "Incubators" who have long used human teenage girls in this manner because the transformation into witches produces massive amounts of energy, which they collect to ward against the inevitable heat death of the universe. Kyoko, spurred on by Kyubey and hoping for a chance to restore Sayaka, takes Madoka with her to try and reach Oktavia. The attempt ultimately fails, with Kyoko sacrificing herself to end Sayaka's suffering. Kyubey, having known that reversing the process was impossible, taunts Homura, saying that without Sayaka and Kyoko she has no chance of stopping Walpurgisnacht without Madoka also becoming a magical girl, something Kyubey wishes to happen in order to harness Madoka's mysteriously enormous potential energy. It is then revealed that Homura's true ability is time manipulation, and that she is from another timeline: Initially a shy student who was rescued by Madoka in magical girl form, and witnessing her demise, Homura forged a contract with Kyubey with the intention of redoing the past to prevent Madoka from becoming a magical girl and save her from her fate. She has relived the one-month period leading up to Walpurgisnacht numerous times in the hopes of saving Madoka, with each attempt ending in failure. With this new information, Kyubey deduces that it is Homura's actions that have caused Madoka to possess the massive potential energy from multiple reset timelines to become the greatest of all magical girls and subsequently a witch whose power dwarfs Walpurgisnacht.

Determined to save Madoka, Homura faces Walpurgisnacht alone, but is ultimately defeated and pushed to the brink of despair, reasoning that resetting time any further will only make Madoka's fate worse. Madoka arrives and comforts Homura, becoming a magical girl with the wish to have the ability to save magical girls across all time from their despair before they can become witches. The paradoxical nature of her wish causes her to transcend into a godlike psychopomp, and establishes a new "Law of Cycles" in which magical girls are purified and disappear into a higher plane instead of becoming witches. The result of the wish causes Madoka's human existence to become erased from reality, with only Homura remembering her. Madoka assures Homura that this is for the best and thanks her, now knowing the full extent of their friendship across numerous timelines. Homura awakens to find herself in a reality where Mami and Kyoko are still alive, as the three of them now hunt new monsters called "Wraiths", and no one else remembers Madoka. Homura describes the previous reality to Kyubey and vows to continue protecting the world Madoka cherished.

Rebellion
After they defeat a Nightmare embodiment of Hitomi's frustrations over her relationship with Kyosuke, Homura realizes something is amiss in their memories. She and Kyoko realize they are trapped in a fake Mitakihara, which Homura recognizes as a witch's labyrinth. Homura proceeds to interrogate Bebe, remembering her to be the witch Charlotte, only to end up fighting Mami, who eventually also remembers they fought Wraiths, not Nightmares.

Homura is spirited away by Sayaka, while Mami is kept from pursuing them by Bebe, now taking her original form as a magical girl named Nagissa Momoe. Sayaka, revealing she possesses her full memories, warns Homura to reconsider uncovering the truth. Homura realizes that after Madoka's wish rewrote the universe, the only one who should remember the existence of witches and their labyrinths is herself. She reasons that she had fallen into despair over previously allowing Madoka to be erased from reality and has become a witch, generating the labyrinth around them. Kyubey confirms that after hearing Homura speaking of a reality predating the Law of Cycles timeline, it and the other Incubators isolated her Soul Gem from the rest of the universe in order to observe the Law of Cycles come into effect. As she fell into despair, a labyrinth in the form of a fake Mitakihara was created within Homura's Soul Gem, and subconsciously populated with people from Madoka's original life. While Kyubey admits that Madoka did appear, and was pulled into the isolated labyrinth, she seemed to be no more than a regular girl, and they decided to observe her until they devised the means to contain her. They wish to do away with the Law of Cycles so they can better amass energy from magical girls transforming into witches again.

Kyubey's intentions to control Madoka provoke Homura into fully transforming into the witch, Homulilly. Homulilly directs her familiars to kill every Incubator within the labyrinth, while resolving to destroy herself rather than be saved and expose Madoka to the Incubators. Sayaka and Nagissa are both revealed to be reborn guardians who serve Madoka as part of the Law of Cycles. They rally the others to help save Homura from herself, and help destroy the barrier imprisoning Homura's Soul Gem. Madoka reaches Homura and together they destroy the barrier, freeing Homura's Soul Gem and destroying the remaining Incubators. Now reconnected to the universe and to her powers and memories as the Law of Cycles, Madoka moves to cleanse Homura of her curse and bring her into the higher plane.

Before Madoka can cleanse Homura, Homura suddenly grabs her, trapping her. Homura separates Madoka into two forms, severing Madoka's humanity from her divinity. Homura reveals that what corrupted her Soul Gem wasn’t a curse of despair, but rather a curse of love. She unleashes this power across the universe and rewrites the cosmos into a reality where her beloved Madoka—and Madoka and Homura's friends—will forget what has happened and return to the lives they led before the events of the series, while Homura herself will assume control over the design of their universe. Homura then transcends her own mortal existence and announces herself as a "demon", a winged figure dressed in black. She gloats to Kyubey that this new reality will force the Incubators to bear the weight of the collective curses of the world. Homura revels in her creation, but she accepts that she may become Madoka's enemy if the latter should regain her memories and godly powers and oppose what Homura has done.

A post-credits scene shows Homura seated in a chair while watching over Mitakihara, with a badly-beaten and mentally scarred Kyubey nearby. Homura dances, as Kyubey lies, unmoving, at her feet. Homura leans over a cliff and falls. Within the dark pupil of Kyubey's eye, the phrase "The End" appears in multiple languages in succession. The final image shown is of a pair of doors or window shutters outlined against the darkness, bound shut by a bow.

Production
The original anime television series of Puella Magi Madoka Magica was a collaboration between Aniplex, Shaft and MBS. The series was written by Gen Urobuchi and directed by Akiyuki Shinbo with original character designs by Ume Aoki and music by Yuki Kajiura. In November 2011, it was announced in the December issue of Kadokawa Shoten's Newtype magazine that a three-part theatrical film project was in development by Shaft. The first film, covers the first eight episodes of the anime series. The film was released in Japanese theaters on October 6, 2012. The second film, covers the final four episodes of the anime series. The film was released in Japanese theaters on October 13, 2012. The first two films feature redone voices and some scenes with new animation. They were screened in selected locations in the United States and seven other countries between October 2012 and February 2013, as well as screened at Anime Festival Asia between November 10–11, 2012 in Singapore. The first two films were released on Blu-ray Disc and DVD on July 30, 2013 in standard and collector's edition sets and is available for import by Aniplex of America. The films were re-released by Aniplex USA with an English dub on Blu-ray Disc and DVD on July 15, 2014.

The third film, is an original story which takes place following the events of the previous films. The film was released in Japanese theaters by Warner Bros. Pictures on October 26, 2013. Special skits featuring characters from the Monogatari series aired prior to the film, with a different skit shown during each week of its screening. The film was screened in North America by Aniplex of America in December 2013. The film was released on Blu-ray Disc and DVD with English subtitles on April 2, 2014 in Japan and was released by Aniplex of America as an import title in North America on April 8, 2014. Madman Entertainment released the film on Blu-ray Disc and DVD on April 8, 2014. A re-release with an English dub was released in North America on April 7, 2015.

At the 10th anniversary event held on April 25, 2021, a sequel movie to Rebellion was announced, titled .

Other media

A film comic adaptation of the first two films, titled Puella Magi Madoka Magica: Film Memories, went on sale on May 26, 2012. A manga adaptation of Rebellion illustrated by Hanokage, who previously did the television series' manga adaptation and The Different Story spin-off manga, was published by Houbunsha in three tankōbon volumes between November 12, 2013 and January 10, 2014. Yen Press began releasing the series in English starting December 15, 2015.

An action-adventure video game based on the films, Puella Magi Madoka Magica: The Battle Pentagram, was released in Japan on December 12, 2013 for the PlayStation Vita. The game follows an alternate plotline to the first two films, in which Madoka makes a wish that all the magical girls could work together and defeat Walpurgisnacht.

Reception
Beginnings grossed more than ¥500 million at the Japanese box office. The Blu-ray Disc edition of the first two films sold over 80,000 in its first week. Rebellion has earned 2.08 billion yen in the Japanese box office, breaking the previous record of 1.93 billion yen, held by K-On! the Movie for a film based on a late-night anime television series. The first week sales of the Rebellion limited and regular edition Blu-rays placed first and second in the weekly Oricon chart, having reached 127,501 and 9,872 units, respectively.

Rebellion was nominated for the Japan Academy Prize for Animation of the Year at the 37th Japan Academy Prize; and won the Best Theatrical Film Award at the 19th Animation Kobe Awards. The film also received a Notable Entry Award at the 13th Tokyo Anime Award Festival in 2014. Rebellion was one of 19 animated films submitted for Best Animated Feature for the 86th Academy Awards, but was not nominated.

Jacob Hope Chapman of Anime News Network gave Rebellion a B rating, praising its story, symbolism and characters, writing "Gorgeous and mind-bendingly creative, far more fascinating and entertaining than it had any reason to be, works very hard to justify its grand shift in theme". Richard Eisenbeis and Toshi Nakamura at Kotaku reviewed the film positively. Toshi's final thoughts being, "I loved everything else about the movie. It plays with your emotions like crazy, but at the same time, it’s emotionally fluid. While you might not agree with characters' choices and actions, they all make sense and are never forced." Richard's final thoughts were, "Personally, I loved it. It's a great character piece and a worthy addition to the franchise". Geoff Berkshire of Variety gave a good review, stating  "Rebellion delivers a convoluted conclusion sure to prove beyond baffling to any franchise newcomers." Berkshire praised other aspects such as the visuals of Gekidan Inu Curry.

Accolades

References

External links
Official website 
Official website of Puella Magi Madoka Magica the Movie: Rebellion 

Movie
2012 anime films
2013 anime films
Japanese adult animated films
Animated films based on animated series
Anime films composed by Yuki Kajiura
Anime with original screenplays
Aniplex franchises
Dark fantasy anime and manga
Films based on television series
Films with screenplays by Gen Urobuchi
Houbunsha manga
Japanese animated fantasy films
Japanese film series
Japanese dark fantasy films
Japanese magical girl films
Japanese supernatural horror films
Japanese-language films
Magical girl anime and manga
Seinen manga
Shaft (company)
Time loop films
Trilogies
Puella Magi Madoka Magica the Movie: Rebellion
Yen Press titles
Apocalyptic films
Apocalyptic anime and manga
Films about witchcraft